The office of Lord Mayor of Liverpool has existed in one form or another since the foundation of Liverpool as a borough by the Royal Charter of King John in 1207, simply being referred to as the Mayor of Liverpool. The position is now a mostly ceremonial role. The current Lord Mayor of Liverpool is Roy Gladden, who has held the post since May 2022.

History
The most prominent Mayors were the Stanleys of Knowsley, of which Sir Thomas Stanley (son of the 3rd Earl) and the 4th, 5th, 6th, 7th, 8th, 9th, 10th, 16th and 18th Earls of Derby have held this office since ancient times.  The Molyneuxs of Sefton have also held this office on numerous occasions over the centuries: Sir Richard Molyneux, his grandson Sir Richard Molyneux Baronet, the 1st Viscount Molyneux and the 7th Earl of Sefton.

When Liverpool was granted city status in 1880 it was deemed necessary for the "second city of the Empire" to have a Lord Mayor. The city was granted a Lord Mayoralty on 3 August 1893 through letters patent making it the equal third oldest office of this kind in England along with Manchester. and Robert Durning Holt became the first Lord Mayor of Liverpool.

For a substantial period of time the Lord Mayor of Liverpool used the prefix of "The Right Honourable" as did the Lord Mayor of London.  Sir Albert Woods, Garter Principal King of Arms was of the opinion that this honorific should be enabled, due to the importance of Liverpool as a city second only to London.  When Sir Alfred Scott-Gatty succeeded as King of Arms, he expressed the view that his predecessor had made an error.  This changed nothing, however, and the city continued to use the prefix up until a Parliamentary statement in 1927.  From then on the Lord Mayor was styled "The Right Worshipful".

William Wallace Currie was the first "Mayor of Liverpool" under the Municipal Corporations Act 1835.

In 1983, the Labour controlled Council replaced the office of Lord Mayor with that of Chairman. The Lord Mayoralty was formally restored in 1990.

The traditional office of the Lord Mayor of Liverpool differs from that of the new directly elected Mayor of Liverpool, an executive position created in 2012 when the functions of the former Lord Mayor were divided. The Lord Mayor's role is now primarily ceremonial in order to represent the city at civic functions and engagements, promote the city nationally and internationally and support local charities and community groups.

Mayors of the Borough of Liverpool (1207–1684) 

 1207–91 Unknown
 1292 John De More
 1293 John De More
 1294–1308 Unknown
 1309 John De More
 1337 Roger De More
 1338 Adam of Liverpool
 1339 Roger De More
 1340 Adam of Liverpool
 1341 Roger De More
 1342 Adam of Liverpool
 1343 Roger De More
 1344 Adam of Liverpool
 1345 Roger De More
 1346 Adam of Liverpool
 1347 Roger De More
 1348 Adam of Liverpool
 1349 Roger De More
 1350 Adam of Liverpool
 1351 William, Son of Adam
 1352 Unknown
 1353 William De Grenof
 1356 William, Son of Adam
 1358 William, Son of Adam
 1361 William, Son of Adam
 1369 William, Son of Adam
 1373 John de Hull
 1375–77 Richard de Aynesargh
 1379 William, Son of Adam de Liverpool
 1382 Richard de Aynesargh
 1382–88 Thomas de La More
 1396–97 Thomas de La More
 1401 Robert De Derby
 1416 Henry De Moysok
 1425 Thurston De Holcroft
 1428 John De Fasakerly
 1448 William Gaythirde
 1454William Gaythirde
 1462 Gilbert Mercer
 1474 John Davinport
 1476 John Crosse
 1477–1539 Unknown
 1540–41 Thomas Hughton
 1541–42 Sir Richard Molyneux (Grandfather of the 1st Baronet)
 1542–50 Unknown
 1550–51 Ralph Sekerton
 1551–52 Thomas More
 1552–53 Ralph Balie
 1553–54 Roger Walker
 1554–55 Sir William Norres
 1555–56 Thomas More
 1556–57 John More
 1557–58 Thomas More
 1558–59 Robert Corbet
 1559–60 Alexander Garret
 1560–61 Ralph Sekerton
 1561–62 Robert Corbet
 1562–63 Alexander Garret
 1563–64 Robert Corbet
 1564–65 Alexander Garret
 1565–66 John Crosse
 1566–67 Robert Corbet
 1567–68 William Secum
 1568–69 Sir Thomas Stanley K.G. (son of the 3rd Earl)
 1569–70 Henry Stanley, 4th Earl of Derby (then Lord Strange)
 1570–71 Ralph Burscough
 1571–72 Thomas Bavard
 1572–73 John Crosse
 1573–74 Robert Corbet
 1574–75 John Mainwaring
 1575–76 William Secum
 1576–77 Thomas Bavard
 1577–78 Sir Thomas Hesketh
 1578–79 William More
 1579–80 Edward Halsall
 1580–81 Robert More
 1581–82 John Crosse
 1582–83 William Secum
 1583–84 Ralph Burscough
 1584–85 Thomas Bavard
 1585–86 Ferdinando Stanley, 5th Earl of Derby (then Lord Strange)
 1586–87 Edward Halsall
 1587–88 William More
 1588–89 Sir Richard Molyneux Bt
 1589–90 Thomas Whicksted
 1590–91 John Bird
 1591–92 Robert More
 1592–93 Giles Brook
 1593–94 Robert Berry
 1594–95 John Bird
 1595–96 Robert More
 1596–97 William More
 1597–98 Richard Hodgeson
 1598–99 William Dixon
 1599–1600 Robert More
 1600–01 John Bird
 1601–02 Giles Brooks
 1602–03 Ralph Secum
 1603–04 William Stanley, 6th Earl of Derby
 1604–05 Edward Moore
 1605–06 Edmund Rose
 1606–07 William Banaster
 1607–08 Robert Moore
 1608–09 Ralph Secum
 1609–10 Richard Rose
 1610–11 Thomas Hockenhull
 1611–12 Edward Moore
 1612–13 Henry Stanley
 1613–14 Peter Ulster Alias Darbie
 1614–15 Richard Mellinge
 1615–16 Sir Cuthbert Halsall
 1616–17 Robert Moore
 1617–18 Edmund Rose
 1618–19 Sir Richard Molyneux, 1st Viscount Molyneux
 1619–20 Ralph Seacome
 1620–21 Edward Moore
 1621–22 Oliver Fairhurst
 1622–23 John Walker
 1623–24 John Williamson
 1624–25 Richard Rose
 1625–26 James Stanley, 7th Earl of Derby K.G. (then Lord Strange)
 1626–27 Edward Moore
 1627–28 Ralph Seacome
 1628–29 John Walker
 1629–30 Robert Williamson
 1630–31 John Williamson
 1631–32 Ralph Sandiford
 1632–33 John Walker
 1633–34 John Moore
 1634–35 Robert Williamson
 1635–36 Thomas Bickesteth
 1636–37 William Dwarihouse
 1637–38 Thomas Eccleston
 1638–39 John Williamson
 1639–40 Thomas Stanley
 1640–41 William Ireland
 1641–42 John Walker
 1642–43 Thomas Bickesteth
 1643–44 James Williamson
 1644–45 John Holcroft
 1645–46 Thomas Bickesteth
 1646–47 Richard Tarleton
 1647–48 Thomas Tarleton
 1648–49 William Williamson
 1649–50 Thomas Hodgeson
 1650–51 James Williamson
 1651–52 Thomas Williamson
 1652–53 Ralph Massam
 1653–54 Edward Williamson
 1654–55 Robert Cornell
 1655–56 Thomas Ayndoe
 1656–57 Gilbert Formy
 1657–58 John Holcroft
 1658–59 Richard Peicival
 1659–60 James Williamson
 1660–61 Alexander Greene
 1661–62 Henry Corles
 1662–63 The Hon. William Stanley
 1663–64 Peter Lurting
 1664–65 John Sturzaker
 1665–66 Michael Tarleton
 1666–67 Charles Stanley, 8th Earl of Derby
 1667–68 Thomas Savage, 3rd Earl Rivers
 1668–69 William Stanley, 9th Earl of Derby (then Lord Strange)
 1669–70 Thomas Bickesteth
 1670–71 Thomas Johnson
 1671–72 Lawrence Brownlowe
 1672–73 Silvester Richmond
 1673–74 James Jerrom
 1674–75 Sir Gilbert Ireland
 1675 Thomas Bickesteth
 1675–76 Thomas Chapman
 1676–77 Robert Williamson
 1677–78 William Stanley, 9th Earl of Derby
 1678–79 John Chorley
 1679–80 William Williamson
 1680–81 Thomas Clayton
 1681–82 Richard Windall
 1682–83 Capt.Edward Tarleton
 1683–84 Robert Seacome

Mayors of the Borough of Liverpool (1684–1880) 

 1684–85 Sir Richard Atherton 
 1685–86 Oliver Lyme
 1686–87 Peter Bold
 1687–88 James Prescott
 1688–89 Thomas Tyrer
 1689–90 William Clayton
 1690–91 Thomas Brookbancke
 1691–92 Richard Houghton
 1692–93 Joshua Fisher
 1693–94 Jasper Maudit
 1694–95 Alexander Norres
 1695 Thomas Johnson Snr.
 1695–96 Thomas Johnson Jnr.
 1696–97 William Preeson
 1697–98 James Benn
 1698–99 Thomas Sweeting
 1699–1700 Cuthbert Sharples
 1700–01 Richard Norris
 1701–02 Thomas Bickesteth
 1702–03 John Cockshuttle
 1703–04 John Clievland
 1704–05 William Hurst
 1705–06 William Webster
 1706–07 Sylvester Moorcroft
 1707–08 James Stanley, 10th Earl of Derby
 1708–09 John Seacome
 1709–10 John Earle
 1710–11 George Tyrer
 1711–12 James Townsend
 1712–13 Edward Tarleton
 1713–14 Thomas Coore
 1714–15 Richard Gildart
 1715–16 William Squire
 1716–17 Foster Cunliffe
 1717–18 Richard Kelsall
 1718–19 Josia Poole
 1719–20 Thomas Fillingham
 1720–21 Henry Taylor
 1721–22 Bryan Blundell
 1722–23 Edward Ratchdale
 1723–24 John Scarbrick
 1724–25 John Goodwin
 1725–26 William Marsden
 1726–27 Sir Thomas Bootle
 1727 George Tyrer
 1727–28 John Huges
 1728–29 Bryan Blundell
 1729–30 Foster Cunliffe
 1730–31 George Tyrer
 1731–32 Richard Gildart
 1732–33 Thomas Brereton
 1733–34 William Pole
 1734–35 James Stanley, 10th Earl of Derby
 1735–36 Foster Cunliffe
 1736–37 George Tyrer
 1737–38 George Norton
 1738–39 Robert Armitage
 1739–40 Thomas Steers
 1740–41 Henry Trafford
 1741 Peter Rainford
 1741–42 William Carr
 1742–43 Edward Trafford
 1743–44 John Brookes
 1744–45 Owen Pritchard
 1745–46 James Blomfield
 1746–47 Joseph Bird
 1747–48 Thomas Shaw
 1748–49 Joseph Clegg
 1749–50 Joseph Davies
 1750–51 James Gildart
 1751–52 Edmund Rigby
 1752–53 Henry Winstanley
 1753–54 James Crosbie
 1754–55 Charles Goore
 1755–56 Spencer Steers
 1756–57 Richard Hughes
 1757–58 William Goodwin
 1758–59 Robert Cunliffe
 1759–60 Lawrence Spencer
 1760–61 John Blackburne, the Younger
 1761–62 John Williamson
 1762–63 William Gregson
 1763–64 George Campbell
 1764–65 John Tarleton
 1765–66 John Crosbie
 1766–67 Thomas Johnson
 1767–68 William Pownall
 1768 Charles Goore
 1768–69 Matthew Stron
 1769–70 Ralph Earle
 1770–71 John Sparling
 1771–72 Thomas Wilson
 1772–73 Thomas Golightly
 1773–74 John Parr
 1774–75 Peter Rigby
 1775–76 James Clemens
 1776–77 William Crobie
 1777–78 Thomas Birch
 1778–79 William Pole
 1779–80 William Crobie, the Younger
 1780–81 Richard Gerard
 1781–82 George Case
 1782–83 John Brown
 1783–84 William Hesketh
 1784–85 John Gregson
 1785–86 Charles Pole
 1786–87 James Gildart, the Younger
 1787–88 Thomas Earle
 1788–89 James Blackburne, the Younger
 1789–90 Thomas Smyth
 1790–91 John Sparling
 1791–92 Henry Blundell
 1792–93 Clayton Tarleton
 1793–94 Henry Blundell
 1794–95 John Shaw
 1795–96 Peter Baker
 1796–97 George Dunbar
 1797–98 Thomas Staniforth
 1798–99 Thomas Leyland 
 1799–1800 Pudsey Dawson
 1800–01 John Shaw
 1801–02 Peter Whitfield Brancker
 1802–03 Jonas Bold
 1803–04 William Harper
 1804 John Bridge Aspinall
 1804–05 William Harper
 1805–06 Henry Clay
 1806–07 Thomas Molyneux
 1807–08 Henry Blundell Hollinshead
 1808–09 James Gerard
 1809–10 John Clark
 1810–11 James Drinkwater
 1811–12 John Bourne
 1812–13 Samuel Staniforth
 1813–14 William Nicholson
 1814–15 Thomas Leyland
 1815–16 Sir William Barton
 1816–17 John Wright
 1817–18 Thomas Case
 1818–19 Jonathan Blundell Hollinshead
 1819–20 Sir John Tobin
 1820–21 Thomas Leyland
 1821–22 Richard Bullin
 1822–23 William Molyneux
 1823–24 Charles Lawrence
 1824–25 Jonathan Blundell Hollinshead
 1825–26 Peter Bourne
 1826–27 Thomas Littledale
 1827–28 Thomas Colley Porter
 1828–29 Nicholas Robinson
 1829–30 Sir George Drinkwater
 1830–31 Sir Thomas Brancker
 1831–32 Samuel Sandbach
 1832–33 Charles Horsfall
 1833–34 John Wright
 1834–35 James Aspinall
 1835–36 William Wallace Currie, Esq.
 1836–37 William Earle Jr., Esq.
 1837–38 William Rathbone V
 1838–39 Hugh Hornby
 1839–40 Sir Joshua Walmsley
 1840–41 Thomas Bolton
 1841–42 John S. Leigh
 1842–43 Robertson Gladstone
 1843–44 Thomas Sands
 1844–45 James Lawrence
 1845–46 David Hodgson
 1846–47 George Hall Lawrence
 1847–48 Thomas Berry Horsfall
 1848–49 John Bramley-Moore
 1849–50 John Holmes
 1850–51 Sir John Bent
 1851–52 Thomas Littledale
 1852–53 Samuel Holme
 1853–54 John Buck Lloyd
 1854–55 James Aspinall Tobin
 1855–56 John Stewart
 1856–57 Francis Shand
 1857–58 James Holme
 1858–59 William Preston
 1859–60 Thomas Darnley Anderson
 1860–61 Samuel Robert Graves
 1861–62 Robert Hutchinson.
 1862–63 Richard Cardwell Gardner
 1863–64 Charles Mozley
 1864–65 Edward Lawrence
 1865–66 John Farnworth
 1866–67 John Grant Morris
 1867–68 Edward Whitley
 1868–69 Thomas Dover
 1869–70 Joseph Hubback
 1870–71 Joseph Gibbons Livingston
 1871–72 John Pearson
 1872–73 Edward Samuelson
 1873–74 Sir Andrew Barclay Walker Bt.
 1874–75 Lieut. Col. Richard Fell Steble
 1875–76 Peter Thompson, Esq. (died 13 May 1876)
 1876 Lieut. Col. Richard Fell Steble (died 22 May 1876)
 1876–77 Sir Andrew Barclay Walker Bt.
 1877–78 Sir Arthur Forwood, 1st Baronet
 1878–79 Sir Thomas Bland Royden, 1st Baronet
 1879–80 Bernard Hall

Mayors of the City of Liverpool (1880–1892) 

1879–80 Bernard Hall
1880–81 Sir William Bower Forwood
1881–82 John Hughes
1882–83 William Radcliffe
1883–84 Thomas Holder
1884–85 Sir David Radcliffe.
1885–86 Sir David Radcliffe
1886–87 Sir James Poole
1887–88 Thomas William Oakshott
1888–89 Edward Hatton Cookson
1889–90 Thomas Hughes.
1890–91 Joseph Bond Morgan.
1891–92 James de Bels Adam.
1892–93 Robert Durning Holt

Lord Mayors of the City of Liverpool (1892–present) 

1893 Robert Durning Holt
1893–94 Sir William Bowring, 1st Baronet
1894–95 William Henry Watts
1895–96 The Earl of Derby
1896–97 Thomas Hughes
1897–98 John Houlding
1898–99 William Oulton
1899–1900 Louis Samuel Cohen
1900–01 Arthur Crossthwaite
1901–02 Sir Charles Petrie, 1st Baronet
1902–03 Sir William Rutherford, 1st Baronet (resigned Jan 1903)
1903 Sir William Bower Forwood (Jan–Feb 1903)
1903 Sir William Rutherford, 1st Baronet (re-elected Feb 1903)
1903–04 Sir Robert Alfred Hampson
1904–05 John Lea
1905–06 Joseph Ball
1906–07 John Japp
1907–08 Richard Caton, M.D.
1908–09 Harold Chaloner Dowdall
1909–10 William Humphrey Williams
1910–11 Samuel Mason Hutchinson
1911–12 The Earl of Derby
1912–13 Sir John Harmood-Banner, 1st Baronet
1913–14 Herbert Henry Rathbone
1914–15 John Edward Rayner
1915–16 Arthur Stanley Mather
1916–17 Sir Max Muspratt, 1st Baronet
1917–18 Sir John Utting
1918–19 John Ritchie
1919–20 Burton William Eills
1920–21 Edward Russell Taylor
1921–22 Charles Henry Rutherford
1922–23 Frank Campbell Wilson
1923–24 Sir Arnold Rushton
1924–25 Thomas Dowd
1925–26 Sir Frederick Charles Bowring
1926–27 Sir Frederick Charles Bowring
1927–28 Margaret Beavan
1928–29 Henry Morley Miller
1929–30 Lawrence Durning Holt
1930–31 Edwin Thompson.
1931–32 James Conrad Cross
1932–33 Alfred Gates
1933–34 George Alfred Strong
1934–35 Frederick Thomas Richardson
1935–36 Robert John Hall
1936–37 William Denton
1937–38 Michael Cory Dixon
1938–39 Sir Sydney Jones
1939–40 Sir Sydney Jones
1940–41 Sir Sydney Jones
1941–42 Sir Sydney Jones
1942–43 Robert Duncan French
1943–44 Austin Harford
1944–45 The Earl of Sefton
1945–46 Luke Hogan 
1946–47 William Gainsborough Gregson
Nov.1947 – May 1949 Walter Thomas Lancashire
1949–50 Sir Joseph Jackson Cleary
1950–51 The Revd. Harry Dixon Longbottom
1951–52 Vere Egerton Cotton 
1952–53 Albert Morrow
1953–54 William John Tristram
1954–55 Alexander Griffin
1955–56 Reginald Richard Bailey
1956–57 John Sheehan
1957–58 Frank Hamilton Cain 
1958–59 Sir Harry Livermore
1959–60 Herbert Neville Bewley 
1960–61 John Leslie Hughes
1961–62 Peter McKernan
1962–63 David John Lewis
1963–64 John Mcmillan
1964–65 Louis Caplan
1965–66 David Cowley
1966–67 Herbert Mylrea Allen
1967–68 Ethel May Wormald
1968–69 James Edward Thompson
1969–70 Stephen Minion 
1970–71 Ian Isadore Levin
1971–72 Charles Cowlin
1972–73 Robert Meadows
1973–74 Francis Burke
1974–75 Joseph Robert Wilmington.
1975–76 Owen Joseph Doyle
1976–77 Raymond Frederick Craine 
1977–78 Paul Orr
1978–79 Ruth Dean
1979–80 Doreen Jones
1980–81 James Stanislaus Ross
1981 Cyril Eric Carr
1981–82 James Stanislaus Ross
1982–83 Stanley Airey
1983–84 Hugh Dalton - Chairman
1984–85 Hugh Dalton - Chairman
1985–86 Hugh Dalton - Chairman
1986–87 Hugh Dalton - Chairman
1987 Lady Doreen Jones - 17 March – 19 May
1987–88 Thomas McManus - Chairman
1988–89 Dorothy May Gavin - Chairman
1989–90 Dorothy May Gavin - Chairman
1990–91 Dorothy May Gavin
1991–92 Trevor Smith
1992–93 Rosemary Cooper
1993–94 Michael Black
1994–95 Roger Johnston
1995–96 Michael Black
1996–97 Frank Doran 
1997–98 Margaret Clarke
1998–99 Herbert E. Herrity
1999–2000 Joseph A. Devaney.
2000–01 Edwin M. Clein.
2001–02 Gerard P. Scott 
2002–03 Jack Spriggs
2003–04 Ron Gould
2004–05 Frank Roderick
2005–06 Alan Dean
2006–07 Joan Lang
2007–08 Paul Clark 
2008–09 Steve Rotheram
2009–10 Mike Storey
2010–11 Hazel Williams
2011–12 Frank Prendergast 
2012–13 Sharon Sullivan
2013–14 Gary Millar
2014–2015 Erica Kemp 
2015–2016 Tony Concepcion
2016–2017 Roz Gladden
2017–2018 Malcolm Kennedy
2018–2019 Christine Banks
2019 Peter Brennan (resigned)
2019–2020 Anna Rothery
2020–2021 Anna Rothery
2021–2022 Mary Rasmussen
2022–Present Roy Gladden

References 

Liverpool